Hon. Denys George Finch Hatton MC (24 April 1887 – 14 May 1931) was a British aristocratic big-game hunter and the lover of Baroness Karen Blixen (also known by her pen name, Isak Dinesen), a Danish noblewoman who wrote about him in her autobiographical book Out of Africa, first published in 1937. In the book, his name is hyphenated: "Finch-Hatton".

Early life
Born in Kensington, Finch Hatton was the second son and third child of Henry Finch-Hatton, 13th Earl of Winchilsea, by his wife, the former Anne Codrington, daughter of Admiral of the Fleet Sir Henry Codrington. He was educated at Eton and Brasenose College, Oxford. At Eton, he was Captain of the cricket Eleven, Keeper of the Field and the Wall (two major sports played at Eton), President of the Prefects Society called "Pop", and Secretary of the Music Society.

Africa
In 1910, after a trip to South Africa, he travelled to British East Africa and bought some land on the western side of the Great Rift Valley near what is now Eldoret. He turned over the investment to a partner and spent his time hunting. In Kenya, Finch Hatton was a close friend of the Hon. Reginald Berkeley Cole (1882–1925), an Anglo–Irish aristocrat, born into a prominent Ulster family, who had also settled in the colony. Cole was very well connected in Kenya, being the brother-in-law of Hugh Cholmondeley, 3rd Baron Delamere, the effective leader of the White settlers in the country.

In September 1914, Finch Hatton was commissioned as a temporary lieutenant during the First World War, attached to the East African Protectorate forces fighting in the East African campaign. He served with his friend Berkeley Cole, a former officer in the 9th Lancers and a temporary captain in command of an eponymous irregular force known as Cole's Scouts. The irregular unit was made up of Somali soldiers and regular British soldiers from the 2nd Battalion Loyal Regiment (North Lancashire). After this unit was disbanded, Finch Hatton was given a staff appointment as aide-de-camp to General Hoskins. On the 1st February 1917, he was awarded the Military Cross. 

In Channel 4's Edward VIII: The Lion King, it was revealed that in 1928 and 1930, Finch Hatton played host to the Prince of Wales, later Edward VIII, in a safari that switched from hunting to photography. This relationship led to Edward VIII's taking up Finch Hatton's causes, such as abandoning the use of cars for hunting safaris, and shifting towards filming big game, wildlife photography, and the founding of the Serengeti National Park.

Relationship with Blixen
Finch Hatton was not known to have had any serious romances before he met Baroness Blixen. They were introduced at the Muthaiga Club on 5 April 1918. Soon afterwards he was assigned to military service in Egypt. On his return to Kenya after the Armistice, he developed a close friendship with Blixen and her Swedish husband, Baron Bror von Blixen-Finecke. He left Africa again in 1920 but returned in 1922, investing in a land development company.

By this time, Karen Blixen had separated from her husband, and after their divorce in 1925, Finch Hatton moved into her house and began leading safaris for wealthy sportsmen. Among his clients were Marshall Field Jr and Edward, Prince of Wales. According to a highly sympathetic biography of Beryl Markham by author Mary S. Lovell, in 1930 Finch Hatton succumbed to a love affair with Markham, who was working as a race-horse trainer in Nairobi and the surrounding area. Markham had had a series of lovers, both single and married, and she had apparently had an attraction to Finch Hatton for years, but had not acted on it while Blixen, who gave Markham shelter and support over the years, was most deeply involved with Finch Hatton. During this period, however, he was also still seeing Blixen. Later, she became known as a pioneer flyer herself (Markham attributed her interest in flying to her association with Tom Campbell Black).

Death

On the morning of 14 May 1931, Finch Hatton's Gipsy Moth took off from Voi Airport, circled the airport twice, then plunged to the ground and burst into flames. Finch Hatton and his Kĩkũyũ servant Kamau were killed. His final flight is recounted by fellow pilot Beryl Markham in her memoir West with the Night.

In accordance with his wishes, Finch Hatton was buried in the Ngong Hills, some five miles to the west of the present-day Nairobi National Park. Karen Blixen had chosen the site. "There was a place in the hills, on the first ridge in the Game Reserve that I myself, at the time I thought that I was to live and die in Africa, had pointed out to Denys as my future burial-place. In the evening while we looked at the hills from my home, he remarked that then he would like to be buried there himself as well. Since then, sometimes when we drove out in the hills, Denys had said; ‘Let us drive as far as our graves." Later, his brother erected an obelisk at the gravesite upon which he placed a simple brass plaque inscribed with Finch Hatton's name, the dates of his birth and death and an extract from Samuel Taylor Coleridge's narrative poem the Rime of the Ancient Mariner: "He prayeth well, who loveth well both man and bird and beast". The co-ordinates of the gravesite are: .

According to Out of Africa, there is a memorial plaque on a footbridge at Eton.  The bridge is inscribed with the words "Famous in these fields and by his many friends greatly beloved.  Denys Finch Hatton 1900–1906"—the dates refer to his attendance at Eton.

Fictional portrayals
Finch Hatton was portrayed by Robert Redford in the 1985 film Out of Africa.

He was portrayed by Trevor Eve in the 1988 miniseries Beryl Markham: A Shadow on the Sun.

See also
 List of famous big game hunters

Footnotes

References
 Too Close to the Sun: The Life and Times of Denys Finch Hatton (2006) by Sara Wheeler 
 Out of Isak Dinesen (1998) by Linda G. Donelson
 The Eton College Chronicle (21 May 1931)
 Silence Will Speak (1977) by Errol Trzebinski
 The Lives of Beryl Markham (1993) by Errol Trzebinski
 Out of Africa (1937) by Isak Dinesen (Pseudonym of Karen Blixen)

1887 births
1931 deaths
Aviators killed in aviation accidents or incidents
British emigrants to Kenya
British hunters
Alumni of Brasenose College, Oxford
Younger sons of earls
Victims of aviation accidents or incidents in Kenya
Victims of aviation accidents or incidents in 1931
People educated at West Downs School
Denys
Karen Blixen
White Kenyan people
People educated at Eton College